Open Doors, Closed Windows (stylised as Open Doors • Closed Windows) is the debut album from Disco Inferno, released in 1991 on Ché Records in the United Kingdom. The album was later released as part of the band's compilation album, In Debt, released in 1992 in the United Kingdom and in 1995 in the United States.

Track listing

Personnel
Ian Crause – vocals, guitar
Paul Wilmott – bass guitar
Rob Whatley  – drums

References

Disco Inferno (band) albums
1991 debut albums